Tyler Mislawchuk (born August 19, 1994) is a Canadian triathlete. Mislawchuk's hometown is Oak Bluff, Manitoba.

Career
In 2015, Mislawchuk raced in the 2015 Pan American games in Toronto, finishing in 10th place with a time of 1:49:54. In 2016, he was named to the Canadian Olympic team.  He finished the triathlon in 15th place with a time of 1:47:50.

In November 2017, Mislawchuk was named to represent Canada at the 2018 Commonwealth Games in the Gold Coast, Australia.

In 2019, Mislawchuk won the 2020 Summer Olympics test event. In June 2021, Mislawchuk won the last race before the Olympics as part of the ITU World Cup stop in Mexico. In July 2021, Mislawchuk was officially named to Canada's 2020 Summer Olympics team where he came in 15th place.

References

External links
 ITU Bio
 Official Website

1994 births
Living people
Canadian male triathletes
Olympic triathletes of Canada
Athletes from Winnipeg
Triathletes at the 2014 Commonwealth Games
Triathletes at the 2016 Summer Olympics
Triathletes at the 2015 Pan American Games
Triathletes at the 2018 Commonwealth Games
Commonwealth Games competitors for Canada
Pan American Games competitors for Canada
Triathletes at the 2020 Summer Olympics
Triathletes at the 2022 Commonwealth Games
20th-century Canadian people
21st-century Canadian people